Rizwan Shamshad (born 19 November 1972) is an Indian first class cricketer. A right-handed batsman, Rizwan plays for Uttar Pradesh. He made his first class debut in 1990/91 and has made 100 appearances in Indian domestic cricket with over 7000 runs, with 19 centuries and 37 half centuries averaging more than 45 runs in his career innings.

He is Batting Coach of Uttar Pradesh Cricket Association.

External links

References

1972 births
Living people
Indian cricketers
Uttar Pradesh cricketers
Central Zone cricketers
People from Aligarh
Indian cricket coaches